The 4th Thailand Regional Games (Thai: กีฬาเขตแห่งประเทศไทย ครั้งที่ 4, also known as the 1970 National Games and the 1970 Interprovincial Games) were held in Nakhon Ratchasima, Thailand from 1 to 7 November 1970, with contests in 12 sports. These games were the qualifications for the 1970 Asian Games. At the medal tally, Thailand was third after Japan and South Korea.

Marketing

Emblem
The emblem of 1970 Thailand Regional Games was the emblem of Sports Authority of Thailand on an orange background.

The Games

Participating regions
The 4th Thailand National Games represented 9 regions from 71 provinces.
Region 1 (Bangkok and South of Central)

Ang Thong
Bangkok
Chai Nat
Lopburi
Nonthaburi
Pathum Thani
Phra Nakhon Si Ayutthaya
Saraburi
Singburi

Region 2 (Eastern)

Chachoengsao
Chanthaburi
Chonburi
Nakhon Nayok
Prachinburi
Rayong
Samut Prakan
Trat

Region 3 (South of Northeastern)

Buriram
Chaiyaphum
'''Nakhon Ratchasima (Host)
Sisaket
Surin
Ubon Ratchathani

Region 4 (North of Northeastern)

Kalasin
Khon Kaen
Loei
Maha Sarakham
Nakhon Phanom
Nong Khai
Roi Et
Sakon Nakhon
Udon Thani

Region 5 (North of Northern)

Chiang Mai 
Chiang Rai
Lampang
Lamphun
Mae Hong Son
Nan
Phayao
Phrae

Region 6 (South of Northern)

Kamphaeng Phet
Nakhon Sawan
Phetchabun
Phichit
Phitsanulok
Sukhothai
Tak
Uttaradit
Uthai Thani

Region 7 (Western)

Kanchanaburi
Nakhon Pathom
Phetchaburi
Prachuap Khiri Khan
Ratchaburi
Samut Sakhon
Samut Songkhram
Suphanburi

Region 8 (North of Southern)

Chumphon
Krabi
Nakhon Si Thammarat
Phang Nga
Phuket
Ranong
Surat Thani 

Region 9 (South of Southern)

Narathiwat
Pattani
Phatthalung
Satun
Songkhla 
Trang
Yala

Sports
The 1st Thailand National Games represented 12 sports.

 Athletics
 Badminton
 Basketball
 Boxing
 Cycling
 Football
 Judo
 Lawn tennis
 Sepaktakraw
 Table tennis
 Volleyball
 Weightlifting

Gold medal tally

References

National Games
Thailand National Games
National Games
Thailand National Games
National Games